The New Hampshire Police Standards and Training Council (PSTC) is a government agency of the U.S. state of New Hampshire. The council is responsible for establishing minimum hiring and educational standards as well as the certification process for police and state corrections officers. The council also provides mandatory basic training and in-service training to all police and state corrections officers within New Hampshire.

The council was established by the New Hampshire General Court (state legislature) in 1971. The council is headquartered at 17 Institute Drive in Concord, and is led by a director who is responsible for all administrative operations. The 14-member council consists of:
 two town police chiefs
 two city police chiefs
 two county sheriffs
 two judges of courts with criminal jurisdiction
 the Chancellor of the Community College System of New Hampshire (or designee)
 the Director of the State Police (or designee)
 the Attorney General (or designee)
 the Commissioner of the Department of Corrections (or designee)
 two members of the public

References

External links

Police Standards
Government agencies established in 1971
1971 establishments in New Hampshire